Wayne Manor Estate (or simply Wayne Manor) is a fictional mansion appearing in American comic books published by DC Comics. It is the personal residence of Bruce Wayne, who is also the superhero Batman.

The residence is depicted as a large mansion on the outskirts of Gotham City and is maintained by the Wayne family's butler, Alfred Pennyworth. While the earliest stories showed Bruce Wayne buying the house himself, by the 1950s at the latest, retroactive continuity established that the manor had belonged to the Wayne family for several generations. Along with serving as a personal residence, the mansion sits above the Batcave, which Batman uses as his secret headquarters. The vast majority of DC Comics references place Wayne Manor just outside of Gotham City in the state of New Jersey.

The manor acts as a home base and representation of Bruce's old wealth life, despite matching the Gothic architecture present in Gotham. For live-action films, English country house locations in Nottinghamshire, Hertfordshire, and Buckinghamshire, as well as Stevenson Taylor Hall in New York, have been used to depict Wayne Manor.

Depiction

Mansion grounds

Wayne Manor is depicted in earlier comics as being on the outskirts of Gotham City in the state of New Jersey. Comic book portrayals place the mansion within driving distance of Gotham City, close enough that the batsignal can be seen from Wayne Manor alerting Batman of distress in the city.

Wayne Manor's grounds include a surrounding gate around the perimeter with a larger front gate at the main entrance. Batman's subterranean headquarters, the Batcave, is located beneath the mansion.

The grounds also includes a large hill that was partially hollowed out for Batman's aerial vehicles, with the most prominent being the batcave, and there is also an underground river system that is large enough to accommodate docking space for the Batboat and has a large opening for said vehicle.

Batman: The Return of Bruce Wayne
In Batman: The Return of Bruce Wayne it is revealed that Wayne Manor was designed by Nathan Van Derm for Darius Wayne, forming a stylized "W", although the additional gardens that existed at the time the manor was built add on to this symbol to create the image of a bat.

Following the events of Cataclysm
During the events of Batman: Cataclysm a massive earthquake struck Gotham City, the epicenter of which was less than a mile from Wayne Manor. The mansion was seriously damaged, as was the cave network beneath. The ground beneath the mansion shifted significantly, and actually revealed the Batcave below, although the Bat-family were able to relocate all of Batman's equipment before official rescue came to the manor so that nobody would learn Bruce Wayne's secrets. The original Manor was damaged beyond repair, forcing Bruce Wayne to redesign the Manor along with the Batcave. The new Manor is a veritable fortress, a pastiche of Gothic architecture combined with features of castellated architecture. Solar panels are installed in the new Manor, providing sustainable and environmentally-friendly electricity generation for the complex. It also includes a heliport for commercial helicopters.

Batman Eternal/Arkham Manor
During Batman Eternal, Hush's machinations result in Wayne Enterprises being ruined and Bruce Wayne essentially bankrupt after the villain detonates various weapons caches Batman had concealed around Gotham. As part of this bankruptcy, Wayne Manor is repossessed by the city and turned into the new Arkham Asylum following the destruction of the original, but Bruce decides to accept this new status quo, reasoning that he can at least make sure that his enemies remain contained in the new manor given his intimate knowledge of its entrances and exits.

The manor is eventually reclaimed by Bruce's lawyers, but it is temporarily left empty due to Bruce's death and amnesic resurrection as Alfred wanted to give Bruce a chance to have a life without Batman. However, Bruce returns to the manor when he realizes who he used to be.

Access to the Batcave

The manor grounds include an extensive cave system that Bruce Wayne discovered as a boy and later used as his base of operations, the Batcave. The method used to access it from inside the mansion has varied across the different storylines in the comics, movies, and shows. In the comic books, it is typically accessible from a hidden door in Wayne Manor's study behind a non-functioning grandfather clock, which opens to a descending staircase when the hands on said clock are turned to 10:47, the time Thomas and Martha Wayne were killed.

The Batcave is accessible from outside the mansion through a hidden entrance on the estate's grounds. This entrance leads directly to the Batcave and has been depicted in different forms, including a waterfall, pond, hologram, and camouflaged door.

The Wayne Foundation Penthouse

While these grounds are the regular home of Bruce Wayne, he temporarily vacated it in the stories from the late 1960s to the early 1980s, preferring to live in a penthouse apartment on top of the Wayne Foundation building in the city, which also included a secret sub-basement acting as a Batcave.

Wayne came to this decision when Dick Grayson went off to college, which led him to decide that the mansion was now impractical with only one resident and one servant.  Furthermore, Wayne decided he wanted to be closer to his main field of operations in Gotham City than a home situated outside the main urban area would allow.  However, by the early 1980s, Wayne came to reconsider that purpose and decided that being less accessible to the public was more advantageous for his Batman activities and returned to Wayne Manor.

Other versions

Vampire Batman
In Batman & Dracula: Red Rain, Wayne Manor is destroyed as part of a plan to destroy Dracula's vampire family, bombs exposing the interior of the Batcave to sunlight after Batman lured the vampires into the cave following a chase through Gotham's sewers that ended in the Batcave just as the sun rose. Although the manor collapses into the cavern system after a second series of bombs are set off, thus concealing Bruce Wayne's secret, Batman and Alfred relocate to a brownstone in the center of town, Batman residing in a mausoleum in the basement while Alfred prepares his equipment in the main house. Although Alfred and Gordon stake Batman at the conclusion of Batman: Bloodstorm after he succumbs to his vampire instincts and drinks the Joker's blood, he is restored to life after Alfred removes the stake in Crimson Mist, subsequently relocating to the catacombs underneath the remains of Wayne Manor. The manor's remains are finally destroyed for good when Gordon, Alfred, Two-Face, Killer Croc, and Two-Face's gang plant bombs on the cave roof, exposing the interior to sunlight and ending Batman's reign of terror once and for all.

Kingdom Come
In Kingdom Come, the Manor was mostly destroyed by Two-Face and Bane after Batman's true identity was exposed; the Batcave, however, remained relatively untouched. By the end of the graphic novel, the Manor has been rebuilt as a hospital/hospice for Gulag battle victims.

In other media

Television

Live-action television series
 In the 1960s live action series, the exteriors were shot in Pasadena, California, at 380 South San Rafael Avenue, about a mile (1.6 km) south of the  Rose Bowl stadium. The Bat Cave exterior was filmed in Bronson Canyon, in Griffith Park, Los Angeles.  The interiors were shot at various soundstages, and the primary passage to the Batcave from the manor was located in Bruce Wayne's study, behind a bookshelf that retracted into the wall. The bookshelf was activated by a switch hidden in a bust of William Shakespeare. The bookshelf would disappear to reveal two labeled firepoles descending to the Batcave. Through an undisclosed mechanism, the poles allowed for Batman and Robin to go from their civilian garb to costume (the film based on the TV show shows a switch which initiates the change, though the process itself was never explained). The interiors and exterior of the Wayne Manor was also used in the original Mission: Impossible TV series episodes "Charity" and "The Visitors." It was used in 2016 for another superhero group as the residence of Hydra leader, Gideon Malick, in Marvel's Agents of S.H.I.E.L.D. on ABC. Most lately, the exterior is used as the home of Sam and Jay Arondekar, in the series Ghosts on CBS.
 Webb Institute's Stevenson Taylor Hall reprises its earlier film role as Wayne Manor for the TV series Gotham. A secret passageway behind the fireplace led to the Batcave. During the No Man's Land event in the fifth season, Bruce Wayne and Alfred are unable to return to Wayne Manor after the bridges connecting Gotham City to the rest of the mainland were destroyed by Jeremiah Valeska. Wayne Manor is eventually invaded by Jeremiah and completely destroyed by a number of explosives in the episode "Ace Chemicals". By the series finale "The Beginning...", which takes place ten years in the future, Wayne Manor is mentioned as being fully reconstructed.
 Stevenson Taylor Hall further reprises its role as Wayne Manor for the third season of the TV series Pennyworth, a prequel to Gotham.
 Casa Loma, a Gothic Revival style mansion in midtown Toronto, Ontario, was used as a stand in for Wayne Manor in the TV series Titans. The mansion's exterior is most prominently featured.

Animated television series

 In Batman: The Animated Series, an address is given for Wayne Manor in the episode "The Demon's Quest" stating that it is located at 1007 Mountain Drive, Gotham. The design of the manor was similar to previous versions, but included many more art deco aspects, inside and outside. This version of the manor was built on a cliff overlooking the ocean. The unique shape of the main section's roof vaguely resembled the "ears" of the Batman symbol. The Justice League also visited the manor during the Thanagarian invasion to plan their next attack after escaping captivity. It was damaged during a Thanagarian invasion of the manor itself looking for the Justice League. Following the Thanagarian's defeat Alfred began repairs, with the League presumably using it as a temporary headquarters until the new Watchtower was built.
 By the time of Batman: Beyond Wayne Manor is exactly the same from Batman: The Animated Series except with a few modern improvements. The inside of the Manor appears all but deserted and all possessions covered with blankets. The clock tower now opens with a pull of a lever in the clock.
 In "Epilogue" the grandfather clock has been upgraded further. It is attached to the wall with no supporting bottom and opens similar to an airlock.
 In The Batman, Wayne Manor is depicted as a much taller building, with 7 floors. The initial entrance was hidden behind a video game machine, but following later seasons the entrance was replaced with the traditional grandfather clock and a batpole.
 In Batman: The Brave and the Bold, Wayne Manor can be seen briefly in the episode, "The Color of Revenge", where Batman and Robin use the pole to access the Batcave.
 Wayne Manor East is the manor where Bruce Wayne resides in the episode "#Tween Titans" of the series DC Super Hero Girls. The manor is the setting for the television-show-within-the-show Make It Wayne. Alfred welcomes Jess and Karen to "Wayne Manor East" when they arrive for their babysitting job.
 Wayne Manor appears in the animated series Scooby-Doo and Guess Who?, episode "What a Night, for a Dark Knight!".

Film

Live-action films

Lambert Hillyer serial
The 1943 Batman serial originated the use of a grandfather clock as a door to the bat cave (or "bats’ cave" as it was called in the serial), a device which was then adopted by the comics. The austere bat cave featured only an ornate desk, on the wall behind which was projected the shape of a bat.

Spencer Gordon Bennet serial
1949's Batman and Robin serial showed little more of Wayne Manor than its predecessor did. It continued the use of the grandfather clock as a secret door to the bat cave, which boasted more accoutrements than in the 1943 serial, including a holding cell.

Tim Burton films
The interior, however, is Hatfield House, Hertfordshire. The gaming room from the movie used the long gallery, and the marble hall was used for Wayne's "arsenal" with the two-way mirror. In Batman Returns (1992), an original scale model was used for the exteriors of Wayne Manor. In the sequel, the passageway to the Batcave is uncovered by turning on the lights of an ornament in a nearby aquarium and dropping through a false floor in an iron maiden, although Alfred does quip that he'll "take the stairs".

Joel Schumacher films
In Batman Forever (1995) and Batman & Robin (1997), Webb Institute in Glen Cove, New York was used for the exterior shots of Wayne Manor. In Batman Forever, Dick Grayson discovers an entrance to the Batcave concealed behind a silverware storage cupboard.

Christopher Nolan films
In the more recent Batman Begins (2005), the former Rothschild estate, Mentmore Towers in Buckinghamshire, was used to portray Wayne Manor's exterior and interior. In Batman Begins, the main part of the mansion is destroyed by fire caused by Ra's al Ghul, although its foundations survive intact and rebuilding efforts are underway as the film ends, with Alfred suggesting to Bruce to make improvements on the mansion's southeast corner (where the Batcave is located). The secret passage is an elevator shaft originally built as part of the Underground Railroad, accessed by playing three notes on a nearby piano.

In The Dark Knight (2008), Wayne Manor is still being reconstructed and is thus never seen, though it is briefly mentioned as being near the outer city limits in a neighborhood called the Palisades. Bruce Wayne relocates to a two-story tall penthouse apartment within a hotel he purchased, and his equipment is located in a different area: a secret bunker underneath a cargo container in a construction zone owned by Wayne Enterprises. The penthouse has a secret entrance to a location within the hotel where Wayne hides his equipment as Batman. The monthly maintenance fee is around $31,000.

The reconstructed Wayne Manor has appeared in The Dark Knight Rises (2012) which takes place eight years after the events of The Dark Knight, and Wollaton Hall (which  Mentmore Towers is a near replica of) in Nottingham as Wayne Manor's exterior and interior.  The Selina Kyle drawing room scene in The Dark Knight Rises was filmed in Osterley Park House in Hounslow, England, which is in a suburb of London. In the movie, the mastermind criminal Bane destroys a secret underground facility, an event that leads to the discovery of The Batcave. The film's drawing room is the real life mansion's entrance hall.  The interior was designed by famed Neoclassical architect Robert Adam.  At the end of the movie, after Bruce retires his role as Batman after fulfilling his vows to turn Gotham City into a city of order, he had his associates convert the manor into an orphanage, and named it after his parents.

DC Extended Universe
Wayne Manor appears in Batman v Superman: Dawn of Justice. It has been abandoned for some time, after a large fire destroys most of the house, with Bruce and Alfred now residing within the "Glasshouse", a small modern mansion on the shores of a lake, similar to Farnsworth House. The ruined former Manor; in actuallity, being a digital rendering of the real world, Sutton Scarsdale Hall ruins, located in Derbyshire, England. 

Bruce visits his family's burial vault on the grounds of the mansion and briefly visits Wayne Manor's ruins before his battle with Superman. In Justice League and its director's cut, following the defeat of Steppenwolf and his army of Parademons with the help of Superman being revived, Bruce and Alfred re-visit the manor, accompanied by Diana, with Bruce discussing plans with them on rebuilding the Manor to serve as the new team's headquarters, and suggesting that the Manor's main hall could hold a round table of six chairs. Diana adds that the table should have room for more seats to be added in future, which Bruce agrees with. The interior of the manor was likely filmed on the Southill Estate in Bedfordshire The Knebworth House will be used again for the upcoming film The Flash.

Joker
In the 2019 film Joker, Webb Institute in Glen Cove, New York was once again used for exterior shots of Wayne Manor, following the Joel Schumacher films and the 2014 television series Gotham.

The Batman
It was revealed in The Batman that the Waynes moved into Wayne Tower and Wayne Manor was turned into an Orphanage where Riddler grew up.

The Flash

In the upcoming film The Flash, Burghley House in Peterborough was used as the exterior for Wayne Manor

Animated films

Batman: Under the Red Hood
Wayne Manor is seen briefly when Bruce digs up Jason's grave site which is located in the backyard.

Batman: Year One
Wayne Manor is seen in the background during Bruce's training and a visit by Lieutenant Gordon and his wife. The design is exactly the same design on the graphic novel of the same name Batman: Year One

Batman: The Dark Knight Returns Part 1 and 2
The design for Wayne Manor is the same one used in Batman: Year One. It served as the home and seclusion for Bruce Wayne after he retires from being Batman 10 years previously due to the death of Jason Todd through unknown circumstances. It lost all power and ran on an emergency generator when Gotham, along with the rest of the United States lost power after Superman deflects a Soviet nuclear missile, which  caused an EMP blast. Oliver Queen visited Bruce at the manor when planning to take down Superman. Wayne Manor was destroyed during Batman's final showdown with Superman in Gotham City after Alfred activated a self-destruct sequence. As the Manor burned to the ground Alfred looked on with sadness as he suffered a fatal stroke.

Justice League: The Flashpoint Paradox
Wayne Manor is seen in the alternate timeline as the home of Thomas Wayne. However it is heavily dilapidated and all but abandoned with Thomas who has taken on the role of Batman, following the murder of his son Bruce by Joe Chill and the descent into madness and transformation into the Joker by his wife Martha. The balcony of the Manor is where Thomas and Barry Allen attempt on two occasions to restore Barry's connection to the Speed Force. The design used for the manor is the same one used for Batman: Year One and Batman: The Dark Knight Returns animated films. After Barry repairs the timeline, Wayne Manor is once again the residence of Bruce Wayne and restored to pristine condition.

The Lego Batman Movie
Wayne Manor is featured in The Lego Batman Movie being located on an island called "Wayne Island". The entrance to the Batcave is accessed behind a fireplace. Wayne Manor and Wayne Island are controlled by a HAL 9000-like version of the Batcomputer, here called "'Puter".

Video games

Injustice: Gods Among Us
In Injustice: Gods Among Us, Wayne Manor is seen in a parallel universe where Superman rules the world. Because Batman's Insurgency opposed him, Superman exposed his identity and had the manor cordoned off. Batman, accompanied by Green Arrow, Wonder Woman, Green Lantern and Aquaman from another universe, infiltrate Wayne Manor to access the Batcave to retrieve a kryptonite weapon to use against Superman.

Batman: Arkham
Batman: Arkham City features several challenge maps set in Wayne Manor, including its main hall and armory. The interior of Wayne Manor is featured in the Batman: Arkham Origins DLC, Cold, Cold Heart. Bruce Wayne's New Year's Eve party is crashed by Mister Freeze and Penguin's gang, in search of Ferris Boyle. Wayne Manor is briefly featured in Batman: Arkham Knight. It is visible outside the game's bounds. After Scarecrow exposes Batman's identity to the world, a crowd of reporters gather outside the estate gates. The Dark Knight then returns to the manor to enact the Knightfall Protocol. Soon after he is greeted by Alfred and steps inside, Wayne Manor is destroyed by a series of explosions, giving the world the impression that Batman has died.

Music
The lyrics to the song "She Looks Like Fun" on the album Tranquility Base Hotel and Casino by Arctic Monkeys mention Wayne Manor.

References

External links
Architectural Blueprints of Archetypal TV Homes
Wayne Manor
Architectural Digest: Evolution Of Batman’s Wayne Manor

Fictional houses
Fictional elements introduced in 1939
DC Comics locations
Gotham City
Fictional buildings and structures originating in comic books